Lam Shuk-yee  (born June 1953) is the former President of the Hong Kong Federation of Trade Unions (FTU), the most powerful trade union in Hong Kong. She is also current member of the National Committee of the Chinese People's Political Consultative Conference (CPPCC).

Biography
Lam was born in 1953. She was aided by leftist union during his father's illness and she was young and joined the Hong Kong and Kowloon Federation of Trade Unions in 1968 as an electronic factory worker. She was the Vice-President of the Hong Kong Federation of Trade Unions (FTU) before in April 2012 when she succeeded Cheng Yiu-tong, the long-serving head of the unions, to become the first female President of the FTU. She is also member of the Chinese People's Political Consultative Conference (CPPCC) since 2008.

In April 2018, she stepped down as the President of the FTU and was succeeded by Ng Chau-pei.

In November 2020, following the expulsion of 4 pro-democracy lawmakers from the Legislative Council, Lam said it was necessary that the NPCSC decision was made.

Personal life
She is wife of Wong Ting-kwong, the Democratic Alliance for the Betterment and Progress of Hong Kong Legislative Councillor.

References

1953 births
Living people
Hong Kong trade unionists
Hong Kong Federation of Trade Unions
Members of the 13th Chinese People's Political Consultative Conference
Members of the National Committee of the Chinese People's Political Consultative Conference
Members of the Selection Committee of Hong Kong
Members of the Election Committee of Hong Kong, 1998–2000
Members of the Election Committee of Hong Kong, 2000–2005
Members of the Election Committee of Hong Kong, 2007–2012
Members of the Election Committee of Hong Kong, 2012–2017
Members of the Election Committee of Hong Kong, 2017–2021
Recipients of the Silver Bauhinia Star
Recipients of the Gold Bauhinia Star
20th-century Hong Kong women politicians
21st-century Hong Kong women politicians